Birnie may refer to:

 Birnie (surname)
 Birnie, Moray, a former inhabited place and civil parish south of Elgin, Moray, Scotland; an archaeological site where hoards of artefacts and Roman coins predating the Roman invasion of Scotland by Septimius Severus (208 AD) have been discovered
Birnie Kirk, a Church of Scotland church at Birnie, Moray, first cathedral of the Bishop of Moray
Birnie Island, a small uninhabited coral island in the Republic of Kiribati
Birnie Loch, a loch in North East Fife, Scotland

See also
 Bernie (disambiguation)
 Byrnie, a form of chainmail armour